Ashanti Mutinta, known professionally as Backxwash, is a Zambian-Canadian rapper and producer based in Montreal, Quebec. She is most noted for her 2020 album God Has Nothing to Do with This Leave Him Out of It, which won the 2020 Polaris Music Prize.

Biography
Born and raised in Lusaka, Zambia, Mutinta began rapping and producing music in FL Studio before moving to British Columbia, Canada at age 17 to attend university for computer science.

After completing her degree she moved to Montreal, where she began performing at jam nights and released her debut extended play (EP) F.R.E.A.K.S. in 2018. She followed up later the same year with the EP Black Sailor Moon. Around the same time, she came out as transgender.

God Has Nothing to Do with This Leave Him Out of It, her first full-length album, was released in May 2020. Her musical style blends hip hop with heavy metal and post-rock, including Black Sabbath samples and instrumental interludes influenced by Godspeed You! Black Emperor. However, the album featured numerous uncleared samples, which have forced its removal from online music stores and streaming services, meaning that it is now available solely as a free download from Backxwash's Bandcamp page.

She would then release her third full-length album, I Lie Here Buried with My Rings and My Dresses, on June 20, 2021, to generally positive reviews. I Lie Here Buried with My Rings and My Dresses was longlisted for the 2022 Polaris Music Prize.

Backxwash's "Don't Come to the Woods" and "Devil in a Moshpit" appeared in Season 1, Episode 2 of the Showtime series, Work in Progress.

Discography
Studio albums
 Deviancy (2019)
 God Has Nothing to Do with This Leave Him Out of It (2020)
 I Lie Here Buried with My Rings and My Dresses (2021)
 His Happiness Shall Come First Even Though We Are Suffering (2022)

Extended plays
 F.R.E.A.K.S (2018)
 Black Sailor Moon (2018)
 Stigmata (2020)

References

External links
 

21st-century Canadian rappers
Canadian women rappers
Black Canadian musicians
Black Canadian LGBT people
Canadian LGBT musicians
Zambian emigrants to Canada
People from Lusaka
Living people
LGBT rappers
Transgender women musicians
Polaris Music Prize winners
Zambian rappers
Zambian LGBT people
Trap metal musicians
1991 births
21st-century Canadian LGBT people
Women heavy metal singers
21st-century women rappers
Transgender singers